Chris Eatough (born 30 October 1974, England) is a British mountain bike racer (now retired) who was part of the Trek Racing Cooperative team. He is a six-time 24-hour solo World Cup champion and five-time 24-hour solo National Cup champion.

Career
Chris Eatough played soccer at the college level at Clemson University while pursuing a degree in engineering. He became involved in mountain biking after graduation, and became a professional in 1999. He specializes in 24-hour, endurance and ultra-marathon events.  He has won six 24-hour solo world championships and two 24-hour solo NORBA national championship.  Trek Bicycle Corporation is his primary sponsor.  He currently rides for the Trek Racing Cooperative Team, formerly the Trek VW team with Jeremiah Bishop, Travis Brown, Sue Haywood, Lea Davison and Ross Schnell. Eatough also coaches.

After retiring from professional racing in 2009, Chris was hired as the program manager for Bike Arlington.  In that capacity, he led Arlington Virginia's efforts for the 2010 launch of Capital Bikeshare, the regional bicycle sharing program for the Washington, DC metropolitan area.

In 2014, Eatough became Howard County, Maryland's first Bike and Pedestrian Manager for the county's Department of Planning and Zoning, He lives in Elkridge.

Documentary
Eatough was the subject of a 2007 documentary produced in the USA by Gripped Films and directed by Ken Bell and Jason Berry entitled 24Solo. It showed his 2006 season, specifically his success in 24-hour races. The film covers in lesser detail his private life and the success of his team.

Palmarès

2003
1st, 24 Hours of Adrenalin world solo championship (4th consecutive)
1st, 24 Hour Solo NORBA national championship  (1st win)
1st, Wilderness 101, Pennsylvania
2004
1st, 24 Hours of Adrenalin world solo championship (5th consecutive)
1st, 24 Hour Solo NORBA national championship (2nd consecutive)
1st, Wilderness 101, Pennsylvania
2005
1st, 24 Hours of Adrenalin world solo championship (6th consecutive)
1st, Wilderness 101, Pennsylvania
1st, Marathon NORBA National # 2, Arizona
2nd, Marathon NORBA National # 1, Texas
2006
1st, Lumberjack 100 (NUE Race), Michigan
2nd, Shenandoah 100 (NUE Race), Virginia
2nd, 24 Hours of Adrenalin world solo championship
2007
1st, 24 Hours of Moab, Utah
1st, 24 Hours of 9 Mile, 24 Hour Solo National Championship, Wisconsin
1st, BC Bike Race, British Columbia, Canada (with teammate Jeff Schalk)
National Ultra Endurance Series Champion
1st, Cohutta 100 (NUE Race), Tennessee
1st, Mohican MTB 100 (NUE Race), Ohio
1st, Lumberjack 100 (NUE Race), Michigan
1st, Endurance 100 (NUE Race), Utah
2008
1st, 24 Hours of 9 Mile, 24 Hour Solo National Championship, Wisconsin
1st, Shenandoah 100 (NUE Race), Virginia
1st, Tahoe-Sierra 100 (NUE Race), California
2nd, Wilderness 101 (NUE Race), Pennsylvania
2nd, Mohican MTB 100 (NUE Race), Ohio
2nd, BC Bike Race, British Columbia, Canada (with teammate Jeff Schalk)

References

Marathon Mountain Bike Races

External links
Chris' Personal Website
An interview with Chris by Ray Easterling on Cycling News

1974 births
Living people
British male cyclists
Marathon mountain bikers
People educated at Bolton School
Place of birth missing (living people)
People from Elkridge, Maryland
21st-century British people